Thalotia beluchistana is a species of sea snail, a marine gastropod mollusk in the family Trochidae, the top snails.

In 1901, Melvill expressed the opinion that some malacologists might consider this species to belong in the genus Calliostoma.

Description

Distribution
This marine species occurs in the Gulf of Oman, the Persian Gulf and in the Arabian Sea.

References

beluchistana
Gastropods described in 1897